The Alaknanda is a Himalayan river in the Indian state of Uttarakhand and one of the two headstreams of the Ganges, the major river of Northern India and the holy river of Hinduism. In hydrology, the Alaknanda is considered the source stream of the Ganges on account of its greater length and discharge; however, in Hindu tradition and culture, the other headstream, the Bhagirathi, is considered the source stream.

Course
The Alaknanda rises at the confluence and foot of the Satopanth and Bhagirath Kharak glaciers in Uttarakhand. From its origin, it travels to the village of Mana, meets with the Saraswati River, a right bank tributary, and continues downstream through narrow valleys. It reaches the Badrinath valley, arrives at Hanumanchatti, and meets with the Ghrit Ganga, a right bank tributary. From Hanumanchatti, the river goes to Pandukeshwar and flows through wide valleys and steep terrains. At Vishnuprayag it meets Dhauliganga, a left bank tributary, and travels west to the town of Joshimath. From Joshimath, the Alaknanda crosses the Main Central Thrust near Helang. It then meets with Birahi Ganga, a left bank tributary at Birahi. The river reaches the town of Nandprayag and joins with the Nandakini River, a left bank tributary. At Karanprayag, the Pindar River, a left bank tributary, meets with the Alaknanda River. At Rudraprayag, it meets with the Mandakini River, a right bank tributary. As the Alaknanda flows past Rudraprayag, it enters a wide valley near Srinagar, Garhwal. At Devprayag the Alaknanda River converges with the Bhagirathi River and travels onward as the Ganges River.

The Alaknanda contributes a significantly larger portion to the flow of the Ganges than the Bhagirathi. The Alaknanda system drains parts of Chamoli, Tehri, and Pauri districts.

Religious significance
The Alaknanda River is of special interest to the pilgrims who visit the important pilgrimage places in Uttarakhand. The Ganges as Alaknanda  rises in the southern Himalayas on the Indian side of the Tibet border. It is named after the Hindu trinity, Brahma, Vishnu, and Shiva.

Badrinath Rishi Ganga River meet Alaknanda

Badrinath, one of the holy destinations for Hindus in India is located near to the bank of the Alaknanda River.  This place is surrounded by two mountain ranges of Nar and Narayan on either sides and Neelkanth peak located at the back of Narayan range.

Govindgath :.   LaxmanGanga meet Alaknanda

Panch Prayag

Several rivers in the Garhwal region merge with the Alaknanda at places called prayag or 'holy confluence of rivers'. These are:
 Vishnuprayag, where the Alaknanda is met by the Dhauliganga River
 Nandaprayag, where it is met by the Nandakini River
 Karnaprayag, where it is met by the Pindar River
 Rudraprayag, where it is met by the Mandakini River
 Devprayag, where it meets the Bhagirathi River and officially becomes the Ganges

Recreation
The Alaknanda river is among the best for river rafting in the world due to its high rafting grade.

Dams
There are 37 hydroelectric dams in operation, under construction or planned to harness the energy of the Alaknanda river and its tributaries and generate electricity.

There are 23 other proposed projects in the Alaknanda river basin through which the power-potential of the Alaknanda and its tributaries can be harnessed. The proposed 23 hydel-projects are as follows -
 Alaknanda (Badrinath) (300 MW)
 Bagoli (72 MW)
 Bowla Nandprayag (132 MW)
 Chuni Semi (60 MW)
 Deodi (60 MW)
 Devsari Dam (255 MW)
 Gaurikund (18.6 MW)
 Gohana Tal (60 MW)
 Jelam Tamak (60 MW)
 Karnaprayag (160 MW)
 Lakshmanganga (4.4 MW)
 Lata Tapovan (310 MW)
 Maleri Jelam (55 MW)
 Nandprayag Langasu (141 MW)
 Padli Dam (27 MW)
 Phata-Byung (10.8 MW)
 Rambara (24 MW)
 Rishiganga I (70 MW)
 Rishiganga II (35 MW)
 Tamak Lata (280 MW)
 Urgam II (3.8 MW)
 Utyasu Dam (860 MW)
 Vishnugad Pipalkoti (444 MW)

Towns along the Alaknanda River
As the river flows, the towns along its banks are Badrinath, Vishnuprayag, Joshimath, Chamoli, Nandaprayag, Karnaprayag, Rudraprayag, Srinagar and Devprayag. At each town with suffix prayag, Alaknanda meets another river.

Photo gallery

See also
 2013 North India floods
 2021 Uttarakhand flood

References

External links

 Alaknanda River Britannica.com
 Prayags at GMVN

Rivers of Uttarakhand
Tributaries of the Ganges
Geography of Chamoli district
Rafting
Adventure tourism in India
Rudraprayag district
Pauri Garhwal district
Rivers of India